Muyarchi is a 1953 Indian Tamil-language film directed by Joseph Pallippad. The film stars P. V. Narasimha Bharathi and Revathi. It was released on 5 June 1953.

Plot

Cast 
List adapted from the database of Film News Anandan and from Thiraikalanjiyam.

Male cast
P. V. Narasimha Bharathi
V. K. Ramasamy
K. Sayeeram
P. A. Thomas

Female cast
Revathi
Lakshmiprabha
Saroja
Kamaladevi

Production 
The film was produced and directed by Joseph Pallippad. C. Srinivasan wrote the dialogues. G. Chandran was in charge of cinematography while G. Viswanathan handled the editing. Art direction was done by G. Ponnusamy and C. Thangaraj was in charge of choreography.

Soundtrack 
Music was composed by S. G. K. Pillai while the lyrics were penned by R. Duraisamy Pulavar, S. G. K. Pillai, V. A. Gopalan, Covai C. Archunan and A. M. Rajah.

List of songs

 "Koolitharum Varundhak Kooli"
 "Ponnum Mani Pola"
 "Vichithramaam Vaazhkaiyil"
 "Thaniyoruvanukku Unavillai"
 "Thunbam Theerumaa Vaazhvil"
 "Hai Gulbi Vaango"
 "Saetril Valarum Thaamaraiye"
 "Sallaabamaana Anbe"

References

External links 
 

1950s Tamil-language films